Ramshastri may refer to:

 Ramshastri (film), a 1944 Hindi film about Ramshastri Prabhune
 Ramshastri Prabhune, Chief Justice (Mukhya Nyayadhish or "Pantnyayadhish") in the apex court of the Maratha Empire